WFED (1500 AM) is a 50,000-watt Class A radio station in the Washington, D.C. region. The station, which brands as Federal News Network, broadcasts a news talk format focused on issues and news pertaining to members and staff of the United States government. Owned by Hubbard Broadcasting, WFED's studios are located at Hubbard's broadcast complex in northwest Washington, while its transmitter is located at a three-tower array in Wheaton, Maryland.

WFED transmits with a power of 50,000 watts continuously. A single tower is used during the day, providing at least secondary coverage to large portions of Maryland (including Baltimore) and Virginia. At night, power is fed to all three towers in a directional pattern to protect Hubbard's flagship radio station, KSTP in St. Paul, Minnesota. This results in areas of Northern Virginia getting only marginal coverage at best. However, even with this restriction, WFED's signal can be heard across most of the eastern half of North America with a good radio. WFED became a Primary Entry Point station for the Emergency Alert System in 2014.  From July 2017 to December 2022, WFED was also available on WTOP-FM-HD2 in the Washington, D.C. area and WTLP-HD2 in Braddock Heights, Maryland.

History

Formation of Federal News Network

The format was launched by Bonneville International, former owners of terrestrial-based all-news station WTOP, as FederalNewsRadio.com—the first Internet-only all news station, and the first Internet station to make the jump to terrestrial radio—on February 22, 2000. For some time before then, WTOP had significant listenership among federal employees, and many of them had emailed the station asking for more coverage tailored to federal employees. The programming concept has changed little to this day, except that the Associated Press' All News Radio service originally filled in during the overnight hours, as a complement to WTOP.

It is one of a few radio stations that originated on the Internet prior to moving onto a traditional broadcasting signal. It first found a home on the radio dial in 2004, on the 1050 kHz frequency licensed to Silver Spring, Maryland; that station was founded in 1946 as beautiful music station WGAY, but had become business radio station WPLC by 2004, when Bonneville bought the station and converted it to Federal News Radio and the WFED call letters.

When AP All News Radio was terminated, the station began an affiliation with CNN Headline News, which itself was phased out in 2007 by provider Westwood One. In November 2007, the 1050 frequency increased its daytime power from 1 kW to 3.5 kW in order to better reach the government office workers in Washington, D.C. who comprise its core audience.

The 1050 frequency is now used by Hubbard as regional Mexican station WBQH.

Washington Post Radio

The current WFED, along with WWFD, WWWT-FM and W282BA, were former frequencies and simulcasts of WTOP. On March 30, 2006, WTOP transitioned entirely to FM, with 1500 AM (previously the main frequency) and 107.7 becoming "Washington Post Radio" under the calls WTWP and WTWP-FM, respectively.

The primary AM station was one of the oldest frequencies in the capital. It had originally been founded as Brooklyn, New York station WTRC in 1926, moving to Washington in 1927 as WJSV. A series of power increases culminated in its current 50,000-watt facility in Wheaton in 1940. The call letters became WTOP in 1943.

WWWT-FM had operated as a simulcast of WTOP since 1998. WWFD had simulcast WTOP since 2000 (and carried the WTOP calls on the AM band following the sign-on of WTWP) before switching to a simulcast of WTWP as WTWT on June 28, 2007.

As WTWP, these stations provided news and commentary during the weekday hours in a long-form style similar to that of National Public Radio, but on a commercial station staffed and programmed jointly by the Washington Post and WTOP. From 8 PM to 5 AM ET, the station was programmed as a general interest talk radio station, featuring hosts such as Clark Howard, Larry King and Jim Bohannon. On weekends, WTWP rebroadcast programs produced by Radio Netherlands and George Washington University.

WWWT: "Talk Radio 3WT"

The Washington Post reported that they would discontinue the Washington Post Radio service after Bonneville decided to pull the plug, citing financial losses and low ratings.

Bonneville International officially launched personality driven talk format Talk Radio 3WT, with the WWWT call letters on September 20, 2007 (with 820 using the call letters WWWB). The call letters stood for "Whatever We Want" talk radio from the station's imaging. The morning show with David Burd and Jessica Doyle was retained along with all live sporting events, The Tony Kornheiser Show and automotive commentator Pat Goss. Syndicated talkers Neal Boortz, Bill O'Reilly, Randi Rhodes and Phil Hendrie were initially added to the lineup, as was a simulcast of sister station KSL's Nightside with Michael Castner overnight program. Stephanie Miller was added in November after the Washington Nationals' season ended, and Glenn Beck was added, replacing Randi Rhodes on the 1500 and 107.7 frequencies, in January 2008. 

Sports that had been broadcast on 3WT continued on 1500 kHz and 820 kHz. The stations remained the flagships of Washington Nationals baseball until 2011, when the team changed its primary station to WJFK-FM.

Bonneville announced the sale of WFED and WWFD, as well as 15 other stations, to Hubbard Broadcasting on January 19, 2011; this put WFED under common ownership with KSTP, Hubbard's flagship station and the other clear-channel station on 1500 kHz. The sale was completed on April 29, 2011.

In October 2018, WFED rebranded from Federal News Radio to Federal News Network, as part of an effort to rebrand the station as a multi-platform outlet.

Cully Stimson controversy
On January 11, 2007, while being interviewed on WFED's morning program The Federal Drive, then-Deputy Assistant Secretary of Defense for Detainee Affairs Charles "Cully" Stimson criticized some major U.S. law firms for representing detainees at Guantanamo Bay pro bono. Stimson further suggested that U.S. corporations who retained these same U.S. law firms should reconsider their associations with those firms. His comments drew immediate criticism from legal scholars, professional legal associations and the ACLU, and even the Pentagon itself sought to distance itself and the Bush administration from Stimson's comments. Although he apologized a few days later, on February 2, 2007 Stimson resigned his position with the Pentagon, saying he believed the flap would prevent him from effectively doing his job. The controversy heightened the profile of the station, however, as the station's morning hosts and reporters were interviewed by news organizations around the world about the controversy.

Programming
 

WFED is the flagship station for George Washington Colonials basketball. It also carries selected Navy Midshipmen football, basketball and lacrosse games as an affiliate station. WFED is the flagship station of the Washington Wizards. The station was dropped as the flagship of the Washington Nationals Radio Network in favor of WJFK-FM in 2011, but remained as an affiliate station through the 2020 season, allowing the Nationals' run to the 2019 World Series to be heard along most of the East Coast at night.

WJFK-FM also replaced WFED as the flagship of the Washington Capitals radio network beginning in the 2012-13 season. WFED temporarily returned as the Capitals' flagship in the 2016-17 season when the team and WJFK-FM owner CBS Radio could not extend their agreement. The station remained on the Capitals' network as an affiliate station, allowing fans up and down the East Coast to hear the Capitals' run to the 2018 Stanley Cup Finals.

References

External links

FCC History Cards for WFED

FED
News and talk radio stations in the United States
Hubbard Broadcasting
Radio stations established in 1926
1926 establishments in New York (state)
1927 establishments in Washington, D.C.
Clear-channel radio stations